The Journal of Risk and Uncertainty is a bimonthly peer-reviewed academic journal covering the study of risk analysis and decision-making under uncertainty. It was established in 1988 and is published by Springer Science+Business Media. The editor-in-chief is W. Kip Viscusi (Vanderbilt University Law School), who was also the journal's founding editor. According to the Journal Citation Reports, the journal has a 2021 impact factor of 3.977.

References

External links

German economics journals
Publications established in 1988
Bimonthly journals
Springer Science+Business Media academic journals
English-language journals